Małgorzata Fornalska (pseudonym: Jasia; 8 June 1902 – 26 July 1944) was a Polish communist activist and anti-Nazi resistance fighter.

Biography

Fornalska was born in Fajsławice to a family of communist activists. From 1918, she was a member of the Social Democracy of the Kingdom of Poland and Lithuania and the Russian Communist Party (bolsheviks) as well as the Communist Party of Poland. From July–December 1918 she worked at orphanages in Saratov and Petrovsk.

In January 1920, Fornalska returned to Poland and worked for the Provisional Polish Revolutionary Committee together with her brother Aleksander. Later, she studied at the Sverdlov Communist University and the International Lenin School in Moscow.

Fornalska was arrested and imprisoned several times for her communist activity in Poland in the 1930s. After being released in 1939, she went to the Soviet Union, where she worked with other exiled Polish communists. In the spring of 1942 she was parachuted into Poland, then occupied by Nazi Germany, in order to organize the communist resistance against the occupation. She was elected to the Central Committee of the newly formed Polish Workers' Party and worked as one of the editors of the party's newspaper, Trybuna Wolności.

On 14 November 1943, Fornalska was arrested by the Gestapo and imprisoned in Serbia Prison. She was executed by the Germans in the ruins of the Warsaw Ghetto on 26 July 1944.

Posthumously, Fornalska was awarded the Order of the Cross of Grunwald, 1st class, in 1948.

References

1902 births
1944 deaths
Communist Party of Poland politicians
Deaths by firearm in Poland
People who died in the Warsaw Ghetto
Polish resistance members of World War II
Polish Workers' Party politicians
Recipients of the Order of the Cross of Grunwald, 1st class
Resistance members killed by Nazi Germany
Social Democracy of the Kingdom of Poland and Lithuania politicians
People from Krasnystaw County
People from Lublin Governorate